Rix Mills is an unincorporated community in Muskingum County, in the U.S. state of Ohio.

History
The community was named after Edmond Rix, the proprietor of a local mill.  A former variant name was Rixville. Rixville was laid out in 1854. A post office called Rixs Mills was established in 1846. On 20 April 1858, land was acquired for a school in Rix Mills. The post office was renamed Rix Mills in 1892 and closed in 1902. The community has hosted several stores and a church, which to this day serves as a center of worship and community activities.

Notable person
Miles Conway Moore, 14th Governor of Washington Territory, was born at Rix Mills in 1845.

References

Unincorporated communities in Muskingum County, Ohio
1854 establishments in Ohio
Populated places established in 1854
Unincorporated communities in Ohio